The 1985–86 season was Arsenal's 67th consecutive season in the top flight of English football. In this season Arsenal celebrated its centenary, 100 years of footballing history.

Season summary

After 4 consecutive wins in a run of 8 wins, 2 draws and 1 defeat in 11 games Don Howe resigned on 22 March 1986. With Arsenal on the fringes of the title race, rumours were abound that the Arsenal board had approached Terry Venables with a view to naming him as Don Howe’s successor. When Howe was unable to get clarity or reassurance from the board, he promptly resigned. He was hardly a failure, as the Gunners had not finished lower than seventh in the First Division under his leadership, but in the absence of silverware his exit became inevitable. Adopting a lower public profile than his predecessor, Howe did not invest heavily in the transfer market, preferring to augment his squad by bringing through youngsters such as Tony Adams, David Rocastle and Niall Quinn, but he never attained the desired blend. 

Steven Burtenshaw took over with the club 5th in the league. The momentum was immediately lost and with five defeats in the next seven games Arsenal slipped away from their challenging position. Once again, the domestic cups would see the Gunners fall short.  In the F.A. Cup they fell in the fifth round, losing 3 – 0 to Luton Town at Kenilworth Road after a replay. In the League Cup, another replay saw Arsenal bow out at the quarter final stage to Aston Villa. On 8 April 1986 Paul Mariner played his last league game for Arsenal against Nottingham Forest.  In his final season he made just 5 starts and 7 sub appearances in league and cup but failed to score. 

The crowds declined too. On 26 April 1986 when Arsenal met West Bromwich Albion at Highbury just 14,843 turned up. The 2-2 draw made it just one win in eight matches.  On 3 May against Birmingham City Tony Woodcock scored his 11th and final league goal of the season. He was Arsenal’s top scorer, as he was the previous season when both he and Brian Talbot got 10 each. Only 6,234 were in the crowd at St.Andrew's to see it. Two days later Tony Woodcock played his last game for Arsenal, a 3-0 away defeat to Oxford. Then with the season over, Arsenal finishing in 7th, on 14 May 1986 George Graham became manager.

Squad

Results

First Division

Football League Cup

FA Cup

Arsenal entered the FA Cup in the third round proper, in which they were drawn to face Grimsby Town.

Top scorers

First Division
  Tony Woodcock 11
  Charlie Nicholas 10
  Ian Allinson 6
  Paul Davis 4
  Stewart Robson 4

References

External links
 Arsenal 1985–86 on statto.com

Arsenal
Arsenal F.C. seasons